Let 3 is a modern rock band from Rijeka, Croatia formed in 1987. The frontmen are Damir "Mrle" Martinović (born 15 July 1961) and Zoran "Prlja" Prodanović (born 18 December 1964). Particularly popular in the former Yugoslavia, the band is known for their original approach to rock music and their obscene live performances. Their songs often contain provocative and vulgar lyrics. They are set to represent Croatia in the Eurovision Song Contest 2023 with the song "".

History 

Let 3 was formed in Rijeka in the late 1980s. The band soon gained a reputation for their unprecedented, controversial and sometimes obscene performances, exemplifying the eclectic nature of Rijeka's music scene. The band's members have voiced support for liberal causes, such as women's and LGBT rights, and have taken a vocal stance against conservative politics and the Catholic Church.

In 1997, the band released their fifth album, titled  (translated as 'Outrageous' or 'Unheard-of'). It was distributed as a CD, but it had nothing recorded on it. Nonetheless, 350 copies of the album were sold. Their follow-up  initially had just one copy, which the band refused to sell or distribute. The record company eventually released the album in slightly different versions. As a protest, the band staged a (fake) suicide by firing squad on Ban Jelačić Square in Zagreb.

In late 2000, the band unveiled a four-metre tall statue titled , depicting a woman with a horseshoe moustache and a one-metre long phallus. It was exhibited in various cities throughout Croatia.

In 2005, Let 3 released the single "", a play on the Serbian patriotic song "". In the song's music video, extras dressed in Serbian and Albanian national costumes are seen masturbating. The single featured on the studio album , which parodies Balkan machismo and militarism. The band stated: "We wanted to create an album of what people here fear the most; namely peasantry… and pornography". 

In December 2006, the band was sanctioned by police after performing naked at an open-air concert in Varaždin. The band's defence that they had not been naked because they had corks in their anuses did not convince the judge; the court found them guilty and fined each member . On 14 December 2008, the live talk show  finished early after two of the band members simulated the ejection of a cork from their rectums.

For their performance, they were joined by artist Žanil Tataj Žak as the character "" (meaning 'Lenin' in ). They went on to win the competition on 11 February 2023 with a total of 279 points, thus gaining the right to represent Croatia in the Eurovision Song Contest 2023 in Liverpool, United Kingdom.

Band members

Current members 
  (Mrle) – bass guitar, effects, vocals
 Zoran Prodanović (Prlja) – vocals
 Ivan Bojčić (Bin) – drums
 Dražen Baljak (Baljak) – guitar, mandolin
 Matej Zec (Knki) – guitar, backing tracks

Former members 
 Branko Kovačić (Husta) – drums, percussion
 Kornelije Đuras (Korni) – keyboards, samples
 Ivan Šarar (Faf) – keyboards, programming, samples
 Ivica Dražić (Miki) – guitar, vocals
 Nenad Tubin – drums, vocals
 Igor Perović (Gigi) – guitar
 Zoran Klasić (Klas) – guitar, vocals
 Orijen Modrušan – guitar
 Alen Tibljaš – drums
 Marko Bradaschia – drums
 Dean Benzia – drums
 Siniša Banović – drums
 Ljubomir Silić – bass guitar
 Raoul Varljen – keyboards

Discography

Studio albums 
 1989 – Two Dogs Fuckin'
 1991 – El Desperado
 1994 – Peace
 1996 – 
 1997 – 
 2000 – 
 2005 – 
 2008 – 
 2013 –  / Thank You, Lord
 2016 – 

Awards and nominations

References

External links 
 

Croatian rock music groups
Musical groups established in 1987
Yugoslav rock music groups
Yugoslav punk rock groups
Musicians from Rijeka
Culture in Rijeka
Croatian post-punk music groups
Croatian dark wave musical groups
Obscenity controversies in music
Eurovision Song Contest entrants for Croatia
Eurovision Song Contest entrants of 2023